Cryptococcus gattii, formerly known as Cryptococcus neoformans var. gattii, is an encapsulated yeast found primarily in tropical and subtropical climates. Its teleomorph is Filobasidiella bacillispora, a filamentous fungus belonging to the class Tremellomycetes.

Cryptococcus  gattii causes the human diseases of pulmonary cryptococcosis (lung infection), basal meningitis, and cerebral cryptococcomas. Occasionally, the fungus is associated with skin, soft tissue, lymph node, bone, and joint infections. In recent years, it has appeared in British Columbia, Canada and the Pacific Northwest. It has been suggested that global warming may have been a factor in its emergence in British Columbia.  It has also been suggested that tsunamis, such as the 1964 Alaska earthquake and tsunami, might have been responsible for carrying the fungus to North America and its subsequent spread there. From 1999 through to early 2008, 216 people in British Columbia have been infected with C. gattii, and eight died from complications related to it. The fungus also infects animals, such as dogs, koalas, and dolphins. In 2007, the fungus appeared for the first time in the United States, in Whatcom County, Washington and in April 2010 had spread to Oregon. The most recently identified strain, designated VGIIc, is particularly virulent, having proved fatal in 19 of 218 known cases.

Nomenclature
Cryptococcus gattii has recently been divided into five species. These are C. gattii, C. bacillisporus, C. deuterogattii, C. tetragattii, and C. decagattii.

Disease summary
Cryptococcal disease is an uncommon disease that can affect the lungs (pneumonia) and nervous system (causing meningitis and focal brain lesions called cryptococcomas) in humans. The main complication of lung infection is respiratory failure. Central nervous system infection may lead to hydrocephalus, seizures, and focal neurological deficit.

Environmental occurrence
Soil debris associated with certain tree species has been found frequently to contain C. gattii VGIII MATα and MATa, and less commonly VGI MATα, in Southern California.  These isolates were fertile, were found to be indistinguishable from the human isolates by genome sequence, and were virulent in in vitro and animal tests.  Isolates were found associated with Canary Island pine (Pinus canariensis), American sweetgum (Liquidambar styraciflua), and Pohutukawa tree (Metrosideros excelsa).  

One study concluded "[j]ust as people who travel to South America are told to be careful about drinking the water, people who visit other areas like California, the Pacific Northwest, and Oregon need to be aware that they are at risk for developing a fungal infection, especially if their immune system is compromised."

Epidemiology
The highest incidences of C. gattii infections occur in Papua New Guinea and Northern Australia. Though cases have been reported in various other regions including Brazil, India and the Pacific Northwest of North America.

Unlike Cryptococcus neoformans, C. gattii is not particularly associated with human immunodeficiency virus infection or other forms of immunosuppression. The fungus can cause disease in healthy people, potentially due to its ability to grow extremely rapidly within white blood cells.

In the United States, C. gattii serotype B, subtype VGIIa, is largely responsible for clinical cases. The VGIIa subtype was responsible for the outbreaks in Canada; it then appeared in the U.S. Pacific Northwest.

According to a CDC summary, from 2004 to 2010, 60 cases were identified in the U.S.: 43 in Oregon, 15 from Washington, and one each from Idaho and California. Slightly more than half of these case were immunocompromised;  92% of all isolates were of the VGIIa subtype.  In 2007, the first case in North Carolina was reported, subtype VGI, which is identical to the isolates found in Australia and California.

The multiple clonal clusters in the Pacific Northwest likely arose independently of each other as a result of sexual reproduction occurring within the highly sexual VGII population. VGII C. gattii  have probably undergone either bisexual or unisexual reproduction in multiple different locales, thus giving rise to novel virulent phenotypes.

Transmission
The infection is caused by inhaling yeasts or spores. The fungus is not transmitted from person to person or from animal to person. A person with cryptococcal disease is not contagious.

Symptoms
Most people who are exposed to the fungus do not become ill. In people who become ill, symptoms appear many weeks to months after exposure. Symptoms of cryptococcal disease include:

 Prolonged cough (lasting weeks or months)
 Sputum production
 Sharp chest pain
 Shortness of breath
 Sinusitis (cottony drainage, soreness, pressure)
 Severe headache (meningitis, encephalitis, meningoencephalitis)
 Stiff neck (prolonged and severe nuchal rigidity)
 Muscle soreness (mild to severe, local or diffuse)
 Photophobia (excessive sensitivity to light)
 Blurred or double vision
 Eye irritation (soreness, redness)
 Focal neurological deficit
 Fever (delirium, hallucinations)
 Confusion (abnormal behavior changes, inappropriate mood swings)
 Seizures
 Dizziness
 Night sweats
 Weight loss
 Nausea (with or without vomiting)
 Skin lesions (rashes, scaling, plaques, papules, nodules, blisters, subcutaneous tumors or ulcers)
 Lethargy
 Apathy

Diagnosis
Culture of sputum, bronchoalveolar lavage, lung biopsy, cerebrospinal fluid or brain biopsy specimens on selective agar allows differentiation between the five members of the C. gattii species complex and the two members of the C. neoformans species complex.

Molecular techniques may be used to speciate Cryptococcus from specimens that fail to culture.

Cryptococcal antigen testing from serum or cerebrospinal fluid is a useful preliminary test for cryptococcal infection, and has high sensitivity for disease. It does not distinguish between different species of Cryptococcus.

Treatment
Medical treatment consists of prolonged intravenous therapy (for 6–8 weeks or longer) with the antifungal drug amphotericin B, either in its conventional or lipid formulation. The addition of oral or intravenous flucytosine improves response rates. Oral fluconazole is then administered for six months or more.

Antifungals alone are often insufficient to cure C. gattii infections, and surgery to resect infected lung (lobectomy) or brain is often required.  Ventricular shunts and Ommaya reservoirs are sometimes employed in the treatment of central nervous system infection.

People who have C. gattii infection need to take prescription antifungal medication for at least 6 months; usually the type of treatment depends on the severity of the infection and the parts of the body that are affected.
For people who have asymptomatic infections or mild-to-moderate pulmonary infections, the treatment is usually fluconazole.
For people who have severe lung infections, or infections in the central nervous system (brain and spinal cord), the treatment is amphotericin B in combination with flucytosine.

See also

References

Further reading

Animal fungal diseases
Fungal plant pathogens and diseases
Fungi and humans
Fungi of Africa
Fungi of Asia
Tremellomycetes
Yeasts